Islamia English School, abbreviated as IES, is an English Medium School located in the Al-Dhafra neighborhood of Abu Dhabi. It was rated as satisfactory by the ADEC. The majority of the students are children of Pakistani expatriates living in Abu Dhabi, with significant minorities of Indian, Bangladeshi, and Arab students as well. IES is managed by a board of directors and partners, predominantly housed by members of the Darwish family and descendants of the three founding partners. IES was founded by Founder Chairman, the late Darwish Bin Karam, founder Vice-Chairman, late Dr. Shamsudeen Hashmi, and Founder-Director, late Muhammad Arif Khan. It was founded on the principle of providing easily accessible and reasonably priced education for children of sub-continent students. The current chairperson who is in charge of the school is the daughter of late Darwish Bin Karam, Khadijah Darwish Alqubaisi.

Education

The school used to be affiliated with Federal Board of Intermediate and Secondary Education (Islamabad, Pakistan) for providing SSC and HSSC education. But it no longer teaches the Pakistani curriculum. The last batch to give Federal Board examinations was the batch of 2010-11. It is affiliated with Edexcel for providing IGCSE and IAL education. IES is an accredited exam center for Edexcel Exams, and all Edexcel exams are conducted within its premises.

Academic subjects
The school was founded based on the principle of providing both secular (science, social science, modern languages) and Islamic education (Quran, Arabic language, Islamic studies) to students. It offers classes in Math, Biology, Chemistry, Physics, Pakistan studies, Urdu, (and student's native language from Grade-4 onward) Arabic, Islamic studies, Social science, English language, English literature, Economics, Business studies, Accounting, ICT and Physical Education. From Grade-11 onward, students decide between Commerce and Science subjects. Commerce subjects include Accounting, Finance & Economics, while science subjects include Physics, Chemistry and Biology/Mathematics (depending upon students preference of Pre-Medical or Pre-Engineering).

Hifz-e-Quran Project 
A special feature of the school is the Hifz-e-Quran project. It envisages the memorizing of the Quran over a period of 5 years (from third grade to seventh grade) without disturbing the regular studies of the pupils. This option is open to deserving and outstanding students - both boys and girls.

Facilities
The school provides the following facilities catering to the all-round development of the pupils.

Physical Development 

 Tables for table-tennis
 Gymnasium for indoor games.
 Indoor games like Basketball, Volleyball and Badminton.
 Outdoor games like Football and Cricket (cement ground)
 Instructions on Building Evacuation and Disaster Management.

Academic Development 

 Well-equipped Science Labs for Physics, Chemistry, Biology and Design & Technology
 A General Science Lab for smaller grades
 ICT lab (separate for all sections)
 Small School Library
 An Auditorium for seminars and school functions, Multipurpose Hall and Resource Rooms for events
 Mosque
 Activity rooms for all Sections. Activity rooms are equipped with Audio-Visual Aids, provision of overhead projector in classes, Multimedia, Computer.
 School Canteen is now open and fully functioning.

Achievements
In the 16th Inter-School Athletic championship, Islamia English School secured the third position.

IES received an overall B rating from ADEK inspection.

IES students have secured various positions in the annual Think Science Competition.

The school has a history of academic excellence, with almost every batch of students scoring exceptional results in the IGCSE, IAS and IAL examinations under the Pearson Edexcel board. In the previous years, there were cases of students scoring all-inclusive UMS marks in the sciences across all six units usually offered in sixth form.

Eco Club Achievements 
The IES Eco Club has a big hand in the achievements that the school got honored with, including:

 Best waste mangers award (2012-2013)
 SSI Best lead school award (2014-2015, 2016-2017) winning the award twice in a row securing 20,000 AED each time totaling to 40,000 AED
 TOT 145 Schools
 Trained more than 10 schools for Environmental Education under EAD.

The Student Council

The Council is divided into the deputy council (given only to students of Grade 11) and a central council (the main representative body from Grade 12). It is further divided into two distinct and separate councils representing the Boys' and Girls' section, with no relation to the other. Unlike most schools, members of the council are not voted for or nominated by the student body, but follows an appointee system managed by the Administration and the teaching body. The first three roles in the power hierarchy are determined by academic prowess and reputation, while the others are given out in terms of determined competency, disciplinary records and availability of position. The list is as follows:

A- Heads of the Council

More popularly referred to as the 'Head Boy' or 'Head Girl' (Rank-1), this is a mostly ceremonial position with no distinct attribution of role or specific duties. Following suit is the Student Council President (Rank-2) who is the de facto leader of the council, although still mostly representative, is responsible for internal organization, role assignment and messenger between the school administrative body and the council itself. 

B- Sports In-Charges

Branches into two separate rankings of the Sports Captain (Rank-3) which is responsible for the organization of school events and sports related activities. It also acts as a 'bipartisan' role of sorts to manage the four houses (Blue, Green, Red and Yellow) and their respective House Captains (Rank-4).

C- Secretarial Board of Cultural Activities, Literary Activities, Science Club, Eco Club and IT

A lower body of the Council consisting of secretaries (Rank-5) with specific duties that are not academics or sports-related. Secretaries are usually assigned to teachers that may require their help and are mostly involved in day-to-day duties. The Secretary of Cultural Activities mostly works alongside the Council President to organize events and ensure they go smoothly, do practice runs and hand out awards. The Secretary of Literary Activities is involved in library data logging, promote reading activities and running events that require a high linguistic prowess (and thus mostly works with language teachers). The Secretary of Eco Club is involved in inter-school activities, under the supervision of a teacher they participate in competitions like SSI. 

D- Prefectorial Board 

Consists of seven main prefects (Rank-6) who handle the assignment and duties of 'lower ranked' prefects (Rank-7) from Grade 11 to 10. Usually involved in handing out disciplinary actions and ensuring order is maintained during the entirety of the school day.

The Principal usually acts as an honorary head of office in sectional decisions.

References

Islamic schools in the United Arab Emirates
Schools in Abu Dhabi
Educational institutions established in 1978
1978 establishments in the United Arab Emirates
Pakistani international schools in the United Arab Emirates